The 1966 Australian One and a Half Litre Championship was a CAMS sanctioned Australian motor racing title for Racing Cars complying with the Australian 1½ Litre Formula. It was the third Australian One and a Half Litre Championship and the first to be contested over a series of heats rather than as a single race. The championship was won by John Harvey, driving a Repco Brabham BT14 Ford.

Calendar

The championship was contested over a seven heat series.

Points system
Championship points were awarded on a 9,6,4,3,2,1 basis for the first six places in each heat. Only holders of a full General Competition Licence issued by CAMS were eligible. The best six results from the seven heats could be retained by each driver. Ties were determined by the relevant places gained by drivers in the 1st Heat and then, where necessary, by the number of first places won, then the number of second places and so on.

Championship results

References

Australian One and a Half Litre Championship
One and a Half Litre Championship